Halle is both a given name and a surname. Notable people with the name include:

People with the given name
 Halle (singer) (born 1986), Nigerian actress, singer-songwriter and dancer
 Halle Bailey (born 2000), American singer, part of the duo Chloe x Halle
 Halle Berry (born 1966), American actress
 Halle Butler (born 1980s), American author
 Halle Cioffi (born 1969), American tennis player
 Halle Tanner Dillon Johnson, (1864–1901) American physician
 Halle Tecco, American investor
 Halle Williams (born 2000), English singer

People with the surname
 Aaron Halle-Wolfssohn (1754–1835), German Jewish scholar
 Adam de la Halle (1237?–1288), French-born trouvère, poet and musician
 Bruce Halle (1930–2018), American entrepreneur and businessman, founder and chairman of Discount Tire.
 Charles Hallé (1819–1895), German pianist and conductor
 Charles Edward Hallé (1846–1914), English painter and gallery manager
 Claude-Guy Hallé (1652–1736), French painter
 Elinor Hallé (1856–1926), English sculptor and inventor
 Gunnar Halle (born 1965), Norwegian footballer
 Gunnar Halle (officer) (1907–1986), Norwegian military officer
 Hiram Halle (1867–1944), American businessman, inventor, and philanthropist
 Kay Halle (1904–1997), American journalist, author, radio broadcaster, department store heiress, and intimate confidante to many 20th-century luminaries.
 Louis J. Halle, Jr. (1910–1998) American author and professor of international studies
 Morris Halle (1923–2018), Latvian-American linguist
 Noël Hallé (1711–1781), French painter
 Per Halle (born 1949), Norwegian long distance runner
 Ranik Halle (1905–1987), Norwegian newspaper editor and bridge player

See also
Halle
Hallie (given name)

German-language surnames
Yiddish-language surnames